"Look What the Cat Dragged In" is the third single from English rapper Giggs released from his second studio album Let Em Ave It. The single was released in the United Kingdom on 6 June 2010 as a digital download.

Critical reception
Robert Copsey of Digital Spy gave the song a positive review stating:

Built around a simple but relentless synth riff, 'Look What The Cat Dragged In' has that knack of doing very little but still burrowing into your brain face-first like an earworm. Giggs's deep, distinctive delivery gives a semblance of weight to some very silly lyrics. There's stuff about gettin' the laydeez ("Wanna' lean in ma cockpit / Feelin' ma chopstick"), unprotected sex ("I done it bareback / I take chances"), boozing ("Courvoisier / Fillin' up eight glasses") and the eternal boobs/bum debate ("I'm a breast man but I rate arses"). It'd be a crime to take it too seriously, but there's something fantastically grin-inducing about a rap track so British yet so swaggering and comfortably assured .

Track listing

Chart performance
"Look What The Cat Dragged In" debuted on the UK Singles Chart on 13 June 2010 at number 53; becoming his second UK Top 100 single and thus his second single to miss out on the Top 40. The single also debuted at number 20 on the UK R&B Chart and number 3 on the UK Indie Chart, being beaten only by Fat Les and Dizzee Rascal; remaining on the chart for a total of 4 consecutive weeks.

Certifications

References

Giggs (rapper) songs
2009 songs
2010 singles
Takeover Entertainment singles
Dirty rap songs
Songs written by Giggs (rapper)
Music videos directed by Adam Powell